Nokcheon Station is a metro station on Seoul Subway Line 1 in South Korea. It is located in the northern end of the city.

Exits
 Exit 1: Samsung Apartment House, Chang 1-dong Community Center, Chang 1-dong Protection Center, Changil Middle School, Seoul Changil Elementary School, Sinchang Market
 Exit 2: Nowon Middle School, Seoul Foreign Language High School, Seoul Wolcheon Elementary School, Sangchon Elementary School, Danghyeon Elementary School, Chang-dong Jugong 18 Complex, Chang-dong Jugon 19 Complex, Chang 4-dong Community Center
 Exit 3: Seoul Foreign Language High School, Eungok Technical High School, Seoul Jungwon Elementary School, Korea Gas Corporation, Chang-dong Jugong 17 Complex, Junggye Deungnamu Geullin Park
 Exit 4: Nokcheon Village

References 

Seoul Metropolitan Subway stations
Metro stations in Dobong District
Railway stations in South Korea opened in 1985